Iztapalapa is a station along Line 8 of the metro of Mexico City. It is located on the Calzada Ermita Iztapalapa (also known as Eje 8 Sur) in the Colonia El Santuario neighborhood of Iztapalapa borough on the southeast side of the city.

The station's logo is a sun, representing the ceremony that is celebrated in Iztapalapa every year of the birth of the new sun.

The station was opened 20 July 1994. Estación Iztapalapa is also the name of a firefighting station in the borough.

Ridership

References

External links 

Iztapalapa
Mexico City Metro stations in Iztapalapa
Railway stations opened in 1994
1994 establishments in Mexico